Cresson is the French word for watercress. It may refer to:
 Places
 Battle of Cresson, a small battle fought on May 1, 1187, in what now is Israel, near Nazareth
 Cresson, Pennsylvania, a United States borough 
 Cressona, Pennsylvania, a United States borough
 Cresson Township, Pennsylvania, a U.S. township 
 Cresson, Texas, a United States city

 People
 Cresson Kearny, U.S. survival guide writer
 Charles Cresson, American Olympic tennis player
 Édith Cresson, former Prime Minister of France.
 Elliott Cresson, American philanthropist
 Elliott Cresson Medal, scientific award of the Franklin Institute
 Ezra Townsend Cresson, American entomologist
 Margaret French Cresson, (b. 1889 - d. 1973), sculptress
 Warder Cresson, religious enthusiast
 William Penn Cresson, (d. 1932) Architect, writer and diplomat

 Other uses
 Cresson (wasp), a wasp in the family Crabronidae

See also
 Cressonsacq, a village and commune in France
 Montcresson, a commune in France
 Saint-Martin-de-Bienfaite-la-Cressonnière, a commune in France
 Vaucresson, a commune in France